This is a list of books by Christopher Nicole. Some of his books have been reedited under different titles or pseudonyms.

As Christopher Nicole
Works published under the name Christopher Nicole.

Non-fiction
 West Indian Cricket: the Story of Cricket in the West Indies (1957)
 The West Indies: Their People and History (1965)
 Introduction to Chess (1973)

Novels

Single novels
 Off White (1959)
 Shadows in the Jungle (1961)
 Ratoon (1962)
 Dark Noon (1963)
 White Boy (1966)
 The Self Lovers (1968)
 Thunder and the Shouting (1969)
 Where the Cavern Ends (1970)
 The Longest Pleasure (1970)
 The Face of Evil (1971)
 Lord of the Golden Fan (1973)
 Heroes (1973)
 The Secret Memoirs of Lord Byron (1979) (aka Lord of Sin)
 The Ship with No Name (1987)
 China (1999)
 Ransom Island (2001)
 Demon (2003)
 The Falls of Death (2004)
 Cold Country, Hot Sun (2005)
 Deep Gold (2014)
 The Lion Queen (2014)
 Seas of Passion (2015)
 Queen of Destiny (2016)

Series

Amyot Saga
 Amyot's Cay (1964)
 Blood Amyot (1964)
 The Amyot Crime (1965)

Caribee of the Hiltons Saga
 Caribee (1974)
 The Devil's Own (1975)
 Mistress of Darkness (1976)
 Black Dawn (1977)
 Sunset (1978)

The Haggard Chronicles Saga
 Haggard (1980)
 Haggard's Inheritance (1981) (aka The Inheritors)
 Young Haggards (1982)

China
 The Crimson Pagoda (1983)
 The Scarlet Princess (1984)
 Red Dawn (1985)

The Sun of Japan
 The Sun Rises (1984)
 The Sun and the Dragon (1985)
 The Sun on Fire (1987)

Black Majesty Saga
 The Seeds of Rebellion (1984)
 Wild Harvest (1985)

McGann Saga
 Old Glory (1986)
 The Sea and the Sand (1986)
 Iron Ships, Iron Men (1987)
 Wind of Destiny (1987)
 Raging Sea, Searing Sky (1990)
 The Passion and the Glory (1988)

Kenya
 The High Country (1988)
 The Happy Valley (1989)

Murdoch Mackinder Saga
 The Regiment (1988)
 The Command (1989)
 The Triumph (1989)

Pearl of the Orient
 Pearl of the Orient (1988)
 Dragon's Blood (1989)
 Singapura (1990)
 Dark Sun (1990)

Sword of India
 Sword of Fortune (1990)
 Sword of Empire (1991)

Dawson Saga
 Days of Wine and Roses? (1991)
 The Titans (1992)
 Resumption (1992)
 The Last Battle (1993)

Bloody Sun
 Bloody Sunrise (1993)
 Bloody Sunset (1994)

Russian Saga
 The Seeds of Power (1994)
 The Masters (1995)
 The Red Tide (1995)
 The Red Gods (1996)
 The Scarlet Generation (1996)
 Death of a Tyrant (1997)

Arms Trade
 The Trade (1997)
 Shadows in the Sun (1998)
 Guns in the Desert (1998)
 Prelude to War (1999)

Berkeley Townsend
 To All Eternity (1999)
 The Quest (2000)
 Be Not Afraid (2000)

Jessica Jones Saga
 The Search (2001)
 Poor Darling (2002)
 The Pursuit (2002)
 The Voyage (2003)
 The Followers (2004)
 A Fearful Thing (2005)

Anna Fehrbach Saga
 Angel from Hell (2006)
 Angel in Red (2006)
 Angel of Vengeance (2007)
 Angel in Jeopardy (2007)
 Angel of Doom (2008)
 Angel Rising (2008)
 Angel of Destruction (2009)
 Angel of Darkness (2009)
 Angel in Peril (2013)

Jane Elizabeth Digby Saga
 Dawn of a Legend (2010)
 Twilight of a Goddess (2010)

Queen of Jhansi
Novels featuring the Queen of Jhansi.
 Manu (2011)
 Queen of Glory (2012) (aka Indian Mutiny)

As Peter Grange

Single novels
 King Creole (1966)
 The Devil's Emissary (1968)
 The Tumult at the Gate (1970)
 The Golden Goddess (1973)

As Andrew York
Works published under the name Andrew York.

Single novels
 Dark Passage (1976)
 The Combination (1983)

Jonas Wilde: Eliminator Saga
 The Eliminator (1966)
 The Co-ordinator (1968)
 The Predator (1968)
 The Deviator (1969)
 The Dominator (1969)
 The Infiltrator (1971)
 The Expurgator (1972)
 The Captivator (1973)
 The Fascinator (1975)

Operations by Jonathan Anders Saga
 The Doom Fisherman (1969) (aka Operation Destruct as Christopher Nicole)
 Manhunt for a General (1970) (aka Operation Manhunt as Christopher Nicole)
 Appointment in Kiltone (1972) (aka Operation Neptune as Christopher Nicole)

Tallant for Saga
 Tallant for Trouble (1977)
 Tallant for Disaster (1978)
 Tallant for Terror (1995)
 Tallant for Democracy (1996)

As Robin Cade

Single novels
 The Fear Dealers (1974)

As Mark Logan

Nicholas Minnett Saga
 Tricolour (1976) (aka The Captain's Woman)
 Guillotine (1976) (aka French Kiss)
 Brumaire (1978) (aka December Passions)

As Christina Nicholson
Works published under the name Christina Nicholson.

Single novels
 Power and the Passion (1977)
 The Savage Sands (1978)
 Queen of Paris (1979)

As Alison York
Works published under the name Alison York.

Single novels
 The Fire and the Rope (1979)
 The Scented Sword (1980)
 No Sad Song (1987)
 A Secret Truth (1987)
 That Dear Perfection (1988)
 The Maxton Bequest (1989)
 A Binding Contract (1990)
 Summer in Eden (1990)
 Love's Double Fool (1991)
 Distant Shadows (1992)
 Tomorrow's Harvest (1992)
 Dear Enemy (1994)
 Free to Love (1995)

As Leslie Arlen
Works published under the name Leslie Arlen.

The Borodins Saga
 Love and Honor (1980)
 War and Passion (1981)
 Fate and Dreams (1981)
 Hope and Glory (1982)
 Rage and Desire (1982)
 Fortune and Fury (1984)

As Robin Nicholson or C.R. Nicholson

Single novels
 A Passion for Treason (1981) (aka The Friday Spy)

As Daniel Adams

Grant Saga
 Brothers and Enemies (1982)
 Defiant Loves (1984)

As Simon McKay

Anderson Line Series
 The Seas of Fortune (1983)
 The Rivals (1985)

As Caroline Gray
Works published under the name Caroline Gray.

Single novels
 First Class (1984)
 Hotel de Luxe (1985)
 Victoria's Walk (1986)
 White Rani (1986)
 The Third Life (1988)
 The Shadow of Death (1989)
 Blue Water, Black Depths (1990)
 The Daughter (1992)
 Golden Girl (1992)
 Spares (1993)
 Crossbow (1996)
 Masquerade (1997)

Helier L'Eree Trilogy
 Spawn of the Devil (1994)
 Sword of the Devil (1994)
 Death of the Devil (1994)

Mayne Saga
 A Woman of Her Time (1995)
 A Child of Fortune (1996)

Colonial Caribee Saga
 The Promised Land (1997)
 The Phoenix (1998)
 The Torrent (1999)
 The Inheritance (1999)

As Alan Savage
Works published under the name Alan Savage.

Single novels
 Ottoman (1990)
 Moghul (1991)
 Queen of the Night (1993)
 Queen of Lions (1994)

Eight Banners
 The Eight Banners (1992)
 The Last Bannerman (1993)

Eleanor of Aquitaine Saga
 Eleanor of Aquitaine (1995)
 Queen of Love (1995)

The Sword Series
 The Sword and the Scalpel (1996)
 The Sword and the Jungle (1996)
 The Sword and the Prison (1997)
 Stop Rommel! (1998)
 The Afrika Corps (1998)
 The Traitor Within (1999)

Commando Series
 Commando (1999)
 The Cause (2000)
 The Tiger (2000)

Balkan Saga
 Partisan (2001)
 Murder's Art (2002)
 Battleground (2002)
 The Killing Ground (2003)

French Resistance Saga
 Resistance (2003)
 The Game of Treachery (2004)
 Legacy of Hate (2004)
 The Brightest Day (2005)

RAF Saga
 Blue Yonder (2005)
 Death in the Sky (2006)
 Spiralling Down (2007)
 The Whirlwind (2007)

A Honourable Duncan Morant Naval Thriller Saga
 Storm Warning (2007)
 The Flowing Tide (2008)
 The Calm and the Storm (2008)
 The Vortex (2009)

As Nicholas Grant

Single novels
 Khan (1993)
 Siblings (1995)

As Max Marlow 
Max Marlow was the pseudonym formed by Christopher Nicole and Diana Bachmann.

Single novels

 Her Name Will Be Faith (1988)
 The Red Death (1990)
 Meltdown (1991)
 Arctic Peril (1993)
 Growth (1993)
 Where the River Rises (1994)
 Shadow at Evening (1994)
 The Burning Rocks (1995)
 Hell's Children (1996)
 Dry (1997)
 The Trench (1998)

References 

Nicole, Christopher
Nicole, Christopher
Nicole, Christopher